Valentín Uriona Lauciriga (29 August 1940 - 30 July 1967) was a Spanish professional road racing cyclist. He died in 1967 after he crashed during Spanish Road Championships in Sabadell.

Major Results

1962
1st, Stage 9, Milk Race
1st, Stage 1A, Volta a Catalunya
1963
1st, GP Llodio
1st, Stage 7, Vuelta a España
1st, Stage 7b, Volta a Catalunya
1964
1st, Milano–Torino
1st, Overall, Critérium du Dauphiné Libéré
1st, Stage 8, Volta a Catalunya
1965
1st, Stages 1 and 8, Volta a Catalunya
1966
 Hill Climb Championship
1st, Stage 4, Vuelta a España

External links

Palmarès by velo-club.net 

Cyclists from the Basque Country (autonomous community)
Spanish male cyclists
1940 births
1967 deaths
Spanish Vuelta a España stage winners
Cyclists who died while racing
Sport deaths in Spain
People from Busturialdea
Sportspeople from Biscay